Saint Urbain Street is a major one-way street located in Montreal, Quebec, Canada. The original, southernmost section of the street was built by Urbain Tessier (c. 1624–1689), a farmer and carpenter who settled in the area. The name also makes reference to Saint Urbain.

In the late 18th and early 19th centuries, the street, now stretching northward, was home to several of Montreal's prominent British and French merchants, notably the explorer Alexander Henry the elder. By the turn of the 20th century, sections of the street were industrialised and became run down, and were settled by Jews, predominantly from Eastern Europe. Writer Mordecai Richler immortalised the Mile End section as a centre of the Jewish community in Montreal, and he documented the life there in novels such as St. Urbain's Horseman.

From roughly 1970 onwards, the Jewish community uprooted to Outremont and the street was settled by Greek, Portuguese and Caribbean immigrants. Today, much of the street has been gentrified.

Place-d'Armes station is located on the street while the Place-des-Arts station and De Castelnau station  are right nearby.

It traverses the boroughs of Ville-Marie, Le Plateau-Mont-Royal, Rosemont–La Petite-Patrie, Villeray–Saint-Michel–Parc-Extension and Ahuntsic-Cartierville.

See also 
 Baron Byng High School
 Historic Jewish Quarter, Montreal
 Mile End
Le Plateau-Mont-Royal

References

Streets in Montreal
Downtown Montreal
Quartier des spectacles
Le Plateau-Mont-Royal
Rosemont–La Petite-Patrie
Villeray–Saint-Michel–Parc-Extension
Ahuntsic-Cartierville

Jews and Judaism in Montreal
Historic Jewish communities in Canada
Mordecai Richler